The Vermont Dairy Festival is a yearly festival in Enosburg Falls, Vermont traditionally held on the first weekend of June that is devoted to the Vermont dairy industry.

History
The Vermont Dairy Festival was first held in 1956. It was initially known as Dairy Days with a focus on celebrating the dairy industry for farmers. It became the Franklin County Dairy Festival and then The Vermont Dairy Festival.

It is run by the Enosburg Falls Lions Club. The proceeds from the festival are disbursed to various local community causes and organizations including schools, sports clubs, college scholarships, fire victims, home health, and food banks. 

About 20,000 people attend the event annually.

In 2020, it was cancelled for the first time due to the COVID-19 pandemic. In 2021, it is projected to continue its annual festivities for its 65th anniversary on June 3rd to June 6th, 2021.

References

External links
 VT Dairy Festival

e
Parades in the United States
Sustainability
Agriculture in Vermont